Ian Froman (born 6 May 1937) is a South African-born Israeli former tennis player and tennis patron.

He is known for playing in the Wimbledon Championships in the 1950s, representing Israel in Davis Cup competition in the 1960s and 1970s, and playing a primary role in the founding of the Israel Tennis Centers in the 1970s and thereafter.

Early life
Froman, who is Jewish, was born in Johannesburg, South Africa. He became a dentist in Johannesburg, and then immigrated to Israel in 1964.

Tennis career
Froman played at Wimbledon in 1955, in the Men's singles. In the first two rounds he defeated Stefan Lazlo (9–11, 7–5, 6–4, 2–0, ret.), and Johannes (Hans) van Dalsum (3–6, 3–6, 6–2, 6–1, 6–4), before losing in the third round to eventual finalist Kurt Nielsen (6–3, 6–1, 6–2). Over a decade later, he played for the Israel Davis Cup team in Davis Cup competition in 1968, 1969, and 1971.

Israel Tennis Centers

In 1973, tennis in Israel was played primarily by tourists at beach hotels. That year, Froman conceived the idea for founding the Israel Tennis Centers (ITCs), Israel's countrywide tennis program. By 1974, met four Americans—Rubin Josephs, Harold Landesberg, Dr. William Lippy, and Joe Shane—and English tennis star Angela Buxton, who agreed to launch the necessary fundraising efforts and obtain the necessary sites to build the centers. They built a 14-court National Tennis Center on an old strawberry patch in Ramat HaSharon that was given to the ITC by the Israeli government. It was the first of 12 centers built in Israel—with the others being in Arad, Ashdod, Ashkelon, Beersheva, Haifa, Jaffa, Jerusalem, Kiryat Shemona, Ofakim, and Tel Aviv, Tiberias.

Froman served as director of the center, and then starting in 2004 as its chairman. In 2005, he announced that he would not seek re-election when his term ended in 2006.

Honors
Froman was awarded the Israel Prize in 1989. In presenting it to him, Israeli President Chaim Herzog said: "You have created a virtual social revolution throughout Israel."  He was also awarded the International Jewish Sports Hall of Fame Pillar of Achievement Award.

References

1937 births
South African male tennis players
Tennis players from Johannesburg
Israeli male tennis players
Jewish tennis players
Israeli Jews
South African Jews
South African emigrants to Israel
Tennis in Israel
Living people
Israel Prize in sport recipients
Jewish South African sportspeople